The 2020 season was Seinäjoen Jalkapallokerho's 13th competitive season, and seventh in the Veikkausliiga.

Season Events

Squad

Transfers

In

Released

Competitions

Veikkausliiga

League table

Results summary

Results by matchday

Results

Finnish Cup

Sixth Round

Squad statistics

Appearances and goals 

|-
|colspan="14"|U23 Players:
|-
|colspan="14"|Players away from the club on loan:
|-
|colspan="14"|Players who left SJK during the season:

|}

Goal scorers

Clean sheets

Disciplinary record

Notes

References 

2020
SJK